Manuel Keosseian, in Armenian Մանուել Քեոսեյան, (born 17 August 1953 in Montevideo) is an Armenian Uruguayan former professional footballer who played as a midfielder. After he retired from playing, Keosseian became a manager and has led several clubs including Uruguayan side C.A. Peñarol.

Career
Keosseian appeared for Aucas as a player, and would later manage in Ecuador with El Nacional.

Before Keosseian led the "Rojos" to the 2010  Guatemalan Clausura championship. In Peñarol, He made 75% of points in Southamerican Tournament (Copa Sudamericana 2010), 75% is more than % made by Aguirre in Libertadores 2011.
In the afternoon of 21 June 2010 he communicated to csD Municipal that he would be the new manager of C.A. Peñarol. this opportunity for Manolo is the best received in his entire career as a manager.
Previously, he was the manager of Honduras's C.D. Marathón., which he had led to league titles.
manolo has a great vision of football. He suggested to Bella Vista of Montevideo, hire Egidio Arevalo Rios, Uruguayan midfielder of national team.

Achievements
2007 Honduras Apertura
2009 Honduras Apertura
2010 Honduras Apertura
2010 Guatemala Clausura

References

External links
 

1953 births
Living people
Footballers from Montevideo
Uruguayan people of Armenian descent
Ethnic Armenian sportspeople
Uruguayan footballers
Sud América players
C.A. Progreso players
Danubio F.C. players
Club Atlético Independiente footballers
Expatriate footballers in Argentina
Expatriate footballers in Ecuador
Argentine Primera División players
Uruguayan football managers
Centro Atlético Fénix managers
C.A. Bella Vista managers
Club Universitario de Deportes managers
L.D. Alajuelense managers
Deportivo Saprissa managers
Defensor Sporting managers
Danubio F.C. managers
C.D. El Nacional managers
C.D. Marathón managers
C.S.D. Municipal managers
C.A. Rentistas managers
Expatriate football managers in Chile
Expatriate football managers in Argentina
Expatriate football managers in Peru
Expatriate football managers in Costa Rica
Expatriate football managers in Greece
Expatriate football managers in Guatemala
Expatriate football managers in Honduras
Association football midfielders
Huachipato managers
Rampla Juniors managers